William Louis Day (August 13, 1876 – July 15, 1936) was a United States district judge of the United States District Court for the Northern District of Ohio.

Education and career

Born on August 13, 1876, in Canton, Ohio, Day attended Williston Seminary (now Williston Northampton School) and received a Bachelor of Laws in 1900 from the University of Michigan Law School. He entered private practice in Canton from 1900 to 1908. He was city solicitor for Canton from 1906 to 1908. He was the United States Attorney for the Northern District of Ohio from 1908 to 1911.

Federal judicial service

Day was nominated by President William Howard Taft on April 6, 1911, to a seat on the United States District Court for the Northern District of Ohio vacated by Judge Robert Walker Tayler. He was confirmed by the United States Senate on May 9, 1911, and received his commission the same day. His service terminated on May 1, 1914, due to his resignation.

Later career and death

Following his resignation from the federal bench, Day resumed private practice in Cleveland, Ohio from 1914 to 1936. He was a member of the law firm of Squire, Sanders & Dempsey from 1914 to 1919. He served as special counsel for the Ohio Attorney General in 1919. He died on July 15, 1936, in Wade Park Manor, Ohio. He was interred in West Lawn Cemetery in Canton.

Personal

Day was the son of Justice William R. Day of the United States Supreme Court, and Mary Elizabeth (Schaefer) Day. Day was married to Elizabeth E. McKay, of Caro, Michigan on September 10, 1902.

References

Sources

 

1876 births
1936 deaths
Judges of the United States District Court for the Northern District of Ohio
United States district court judges appointed by William Howard Taft
20th-century American judges
Lawyers from Canton, Ohio
University of Michigan Law School alumni
Lawyers from Cleveland
Burials at West Lawn Cemetery
United States Attorneys for the Northern District of Ohio